Li Huasheng (Simplified Chinese: 李华生; Hanyu Pinyin: Lǐ Huáshēng) (1944–2018) was a Chinese artist from Yibin in Sichuan province. He received his first art training in one of Chongqing's culture halls. He met Chen Zizhuang in 1972, and studied traditional Chinese painting under him, mastering his style in just four years.

Li's fame was so great that in 1980, he was invited to showcase his art for Chinese paramount leader Deng Xiaoping. In 1985 he was elected an honorary member of the Sichuan Academy of Fine Arts, and the following year was accepted into the Sichuan Academy of Poetry, Calligraphy, and Painting.

Li's life has been extensively chronicled in Jerome Silbergeld and Gong Jisui's Contradictions: Artistic Life, The Socialist State, and the Chinese Painter Li Huasheng, and his life has been said to "[epitomize] the path of the artist in socialist China".

Exhibitions

Solo exhibitions 
2016	 	 	 	 	
Li Huasheng: The Meditation Room, Mayor Gallery, London, U.K.	 	 	 	 	 	
Li Huasheng, Art Basel, Hong Kong Convention and Exhibition Center, Hong Kong, China
2014
Li Huasheng: Process, Mind, and Landscape, Ink Studio, Beijing, China
2010
Show for 10 Art Cases, Shanghai 800 Art Zone, Shanghai, China
2006
Li Huasheng: New Literati Paintings, Alisan Fine Arts, Hong Kong, China
2005
Li Huasheng, Alisan Fine Arts, Hong Kong, China
1998
Li Huasheng: An Individualistic Artist, Chinese Culture Center, San Francisco, U.S.A.; Alisan Fine Arts, Hong Kong, China
1992	 	 	 	 	
Solo exhibition, National Museum of Singapore, Singapore
1991	 	 	 	 	
Solo exhibition, Hanart Gallery, Taipei, Taiwan
Solo exhibition, Hong Kong City Hall, Hong Kong
1987
Solo exhibition, Harvard Art Museums, Cambridge; Yale University Art Gallery, New Haven; University of Michigan Museum of Art, Ann Arbor; Henry Art Gallery, University of Washington, Seattle; and Detroit Institute of Art, Detroit, U.S.A.
1984	 	 	 	 	
Solo exhibition, Du Fu Thatched Cottage, Chengdu, China

Major group exhibitions 
2017
Streams and Mountains without End: Landscape Traditions of China, The Metropolitan Museum of Art, New York, U.S.A. 
2013
Ink Art: Past as Present in Contemporary China, The Metropolitan Museum of Art, New York, U.S.A.
2010
The Great Celestial Abstraction: Chinese Art in the 21st Century, National Art Museum of China, Beijing, China; Katherine E. Nash Gallery, University of Minnesota, Minneapolis, U.S.A.
2007
A Tradition Redefined: Modern and Contemporary Chinese Ink Paintings from the Chu-tsing Li Collection 1950–2000, Harvard Art Museums, Cambridge; Phoenix Art Museum, Phoenix; Spencer Museum of Art, Lawrence; Norton Museum of Art, West Palm Beach, U.S.A.
2005
Metaphysics 2005 – Black and White, Shanghai Art Museum, Shanghai, China
Korean-Chinese Contemporary Ink Painting, Seoul Museum of Art, Seoul, South Korea
Ink and Paper – Exhibition of Contemporary Chinese Art, Guangdong Museum of Art, Guangdong, China; Kunsthalle, Weimar, Germany
2001 	 	 	 	
1st Space for Contemporary Ink Work – China: 20 Years of Ink Experiment 1980–2001, Guangdong Museum of Art, Guangzhou, China
1995	 	 	 	 	
Twentieth Century Chinese Painting: Tradition and Innovation, Hong Kong Museum of Art, Hong Kong; Singapore Art Museum, Singapore; British Museum, London, UK; Museum für Ostasiatische Kunst, Cologne, Germany.
1983–85
Contemporary Chinese Painting: An Exhibition from the People's Republic of China, Chinese Culture Center, San Francisco; Birmingham Museum of Art, Birmingham; Asia Society, New York; Herbert F. Johnson Museum of Art, Cornell University, Ithaca; Denver Art Museum, Denver; Indianapolis Museum of Art, Indianapolis; Nelson-Atkins Museum of Art, Kansas City; University Art Museum, University of Minnesota, Minneapolis, U.S.A.
1981
Rivers And Mountains Resemble Paintings: Exhibition of Paintings by Ten People, National Art Museum of China, Beijing, China

Selected collections 
National Art Museum of China, Beijing, China
Shanghai Art Museum, Shanghai, China
Guangdong Museum of Art, Guangzhou, China
He Xiangning Art Museum – OCT Contemporary Art Terminal, Shenzhen, China
M+ Museum, Hong Kong, China
The Metropolitan Museum of Art, New York, U.S.A.
The Art Institute of Chicago, Chicago, U.S.A.
Los Angeles County Museum of Art, Los Angeles, U.S.A.
Harvard Art Museums, Cambridge, U.S.A.
Yale University Art Gallery, Newhaven, U.S.A.
Henry Art Gallery, University of Washington, Seattle, U.S.A.
British Museum, London, U.K.

References

External links
Li Huasheng's biography, Ink Studio.
Li Huasheng: ‘A line is nothing. When I paint a vase, its outline does not exist, it is imagined’, Studio International.

1944 births
2018 deaths
Painters from Sichuan
People from Yibin
Chinese contemporary artists